Mia Zabelka (born 1963 in Vienna, Austria) is an Austrian contemporary violinist, improviser, and composer of Czech, Jewish and French familiar background. Comprehensively educated in classical music from early age on she opened up the traditional understanding of the violin as solo and ensemble instrument towards improvisation, experimental music, and sound art.

Lydia Lunch describes Mia Zabelka's work as "visceral, cerebral and sensual. A gorgeous, haunting sound which employs classical interpretation and experimental improvisation to transcend musical genres, creating a sonic surround uniquely her own. She inhabits a sonic universe lush with soul cleansing vibrancy."

Collaborations
Mia Zabelka  played a.o. with Pauline Oliveros and Alvin Curran.

Compositions
Compositions of her got commissioned by a.o. Foundation Academy of Arts in Berlin, New Music America, The Kitchen, and "Wiener Festwochen".

Cultural work
Additional she workes as curator and artistic director for contemporary music and art festivals besides her own artistic work and concert travels.

Awards
After scholarships from a.o. DAAD (Germany) and the Fulbright commission (USA) she received a.o. the Ars Electronica (Austria) recognition award.

References

External links
 Link to the personal Homepage of violinist, improviser, and composer Mia Zabelka

1963 births
Experimental composers
Electroacoustic improvisation
Experimental musicians
Free improvisation
Austrian violinists
Austrian women classical composers
Austrian classical composers
Living people
Sound artists
Women sound artists
21st-century violinists
21st-century women musicians
20th-century women composers